HMS Meeanee was a two-deck 80-gun second rate ship of the line of the Royal Navy, launched on 11 November 1842 at Bombay Dockyard. She was named after the Battle of Meeanee. The Meanee had originally been intended to be named the Madras, and retained the figurehead of a native of Madras, though it no longer appropriate. The head builder at the H.E.I. company dock and shipbuilding yard was Cursetjee Rustomjee.
She sailed from Bombay for England in August 1849 with Persian artefacts for the British Museum.

Meeanee was fitted with screw propulsion in 1857.

In 1870 she was a hospital ship moored in the centre of Hong Kong Harbour tending to the British Army. personnel.

She was broken up in 1906.

Notes

References

Lavery, Brian (2003) The Ship of the Line - Volume 1: The development of the battlefleet 1650-1850. Conway Maritime Press. .

Ships of the line of the Royal Navy
Vanguard-class ships of the line
British ships built in India
1848 ships